Junri Namigata was the defending champion but lost in the second round to Aiko Nakamura. 
Tamarine Tanasugarn defeated Chan Yung-jan in the final 6–4, 5–7, 7–5.

Seeds

Draw

Finals

Top half

Bottom half

References
Main Draw
Qualifying Singles

Fukuoka International Women's Cup - Singles
Fukuoka International Women's Cup